Harlan Wayne Breaux (born July 6, 1947) is an American politician from the Republican Party. He has served as the Representative from District 6 (previously District 97) in the Arkansas House of Representatives since his being elected in 2018. He previously served in the US Navy and now lives in Holiday Island, Arkansas with his wife, Roxanne, and their daughter.

Biography 
Breaux was born on July 6, 1947, in the town of Cheneyville, Louisiana, to Nelson Lee Breaux (1921-1999) and Evelyn Emma Lacaze (1925-2002). He grew up in Louisiana and, before entering politics, sold insurance and worked for an aluminum company in Lake Charles. He became motivated to enter politics after hearing his local preacher talk "about how Christian people really need to step up to the plate and get involved in politics."

References 

Living people
Republican Party members of the Arkansas House of Representatives
People from Carroll County, Arkansas
1947 births